Bug Heroes is an iOS adventure game developed by American studio Foursaken Media and released on January 6, 2011. A spinoff entitled Bug Heroes Quest was released on August 2, 2011, and a sequel called Bug Heroes 2 was released on February 19, 2014.

Critical reception
Bug Heroes has a rating of 89% on Metacritic based on 11 critic reviews, Bug Heroes Quest rated 87% based on 4 scores, and Bug Heroes 2 rated 90% based on 8 scores.

References

Adventure games
Android (operating system) games
2011 video games
IOS games
Video games developed in the United States